The nautical star is a symbolic star representing the North Star, associated with the sea services of the United States armed forces and with tattoo culture. It is usually rendered as a five-pointed star in dark and light shades counterchanged in a style similar to a compass rose.

Nautical charts

Modern nautical charts use the star to indicate true north on the outer of the two compass circles of a compass rose, symbolizing the North Star. The US Coast and Geodetic Survey started using this symbol in its double-circle compass roses around 1900.

Use as a symbol

Sea services 
The nautical star is an informal signifier indicating membership in the United States Coast Guard, United States Navy, or Marine Corps. The symbol recalls both the five-pointed star of the US national flag and the color pattern of the compass rose found on many nautical charts.

Insignia including nautical stars:

 United States Coast Guard officer rank insignia

 German Navy officer rank insignia

Ships 
The Endurance, in which Ernest Shackleton and crew sailed on the 1914–1917 Imperial Trans-Antarctic Expedition, was originally named after the pole star and retained a large badge in the shape of a five-pointed star on her stern.

Other 
The nautical star is common in insignia, flags, and logos. Examples:
 Sixpoint Brewery in Red Hook, Brooklyn, uses a six-pointed version of the star in its logo to reflect the neighborhood's maritime history.
 Blue Stars Drum and Bugle Corps
The California flag includes a red five-pointed star, which is sometimes stylized like a nautical star:

 Called the NorCal Star, it is sometimes used to represent Northern California on clothing and tattoos.
 Sacramento Republic FC, a Sacramento, California soccer team, uses a red nautical star in its crest.

Tattoo culture

This symbol is part of the tradition of sailor tattoos. A nautical star represented the North Star, with the idea that this symbol would help a sailor navigate or stay on course, including finding their way back to port or back home. A nautical star tattoo can also indicate that a person has crossed the North Sea.

Since the 1990s, nautical star tattoos have become popular in the United States in general. A nautical star may symbolize protection, guidance, and good luck, or metaphorically represent finding one's way home when lost in life or travel.

In the 1950s, some lesbians wore a blue five-pointed star tattoo on the wrist, a location that could be covered by a watch. People getting tattoos to reflect this history may choose a nautical-style star.

References 

Star symbols
Tattoo designs
Polaris